Cameron County is the name of several counties in the United States:

 Cameron County, Pennsylvania 
 Cameron County, Texas
 Cameron Parish, Louisiana